No. 60 Group RAF was a group of the British Royal Air Force. It was established in 1940 with the headquarters in Leighton Buzzard, as part of RAF Fighter Command. It controlled the electronic Air defence radar network across Britain. It was responsible for all civilian and service personnel involved in the operation, maintenance and calibration of the Chain Home radar stations.

The group was formally established within the Directorate of Signals on 23 February 1940.

In June 1944 on the eve of D-Day the group consisted of No. 70 Wing RAF (Inverness, northern signals, including No. 526 Squadron RAF at RAF Inverness carrying out calibration duties); Nos 73, 75, 78, and 80 Wings, twelve separate radar stations, mostly in Ireland, and three specialist units, including the RAF Section of the Telecommunications Research Establishment at Malvern.

By January 1945 it was still part of Fighter Command. It was amalgamated with No. 26 Group RAF to become together No. 90 (Signals) Group RAF on 25 April 1946. Its last commander was Air Vice-Marshal W E Theak.

Squadrons and stations 
Included:
 No. 527 Squadron RAF
 RAF Danby Beacon
 RAF Yatesbury

See List of communications units and formations of the Royal Air Force for the Chain Home wings

References

060
Military communications units and formations of the Royal Air Force
Air defence units and formations
Military units and formations established in 1940
Military units and formations disestablished in 1946